Notice, a requirement in law that parties be aware of legal processes affecting their rights, obligations, or duties. Notice may also refer to:

Common uses
 Notice, a comment, remark or observation
 Previous notice, a concept in parliamentary procedure affecting some motions

People
 Horace Notice (born 1957), an English boxer of the 1980s

Arts, entertainment, and media

Music
 "Notice", a song by Gomez from their 2006 album How We Operate
 "Notice", a song by Ziggy Marley from his 1997 album Fallen Is Babylon
 "Notice", a song by Thomas Rhett from his 2019 album Center Point Road
 "Notice", a song by Diana Vickers from her album, Songs from the Tainted Cherry Tree
 Notice (album)

Other uses in arts, entertainment, and media
 Notice, a review of a play, film or performance
 "Notice", a poem by Patti Smith from her 1973 book Witt
 Notices of the American Mathematical Society or simply Notices, a journal of the American Mathematical Society